Sosis Bandari (Persian: سوسیس بندری, translated as. Port sausage) is an Iranian fast-food or street food, usually served in sandwich shops in Iran in the form of a sub or meal. It contains sausage, onion, tomato paste, ground chilli pepper and other spices. The Dehkhoda Dictionary of the Persian language defines it as a very hot and spicy sausage dish which is common in Khuzestan Province.

Etymology 
The word "bandar" means port and "bandari" means from the port. While there are many ports in Iran, the word is usually used to refer to southern Iranian port cities and towns of the Persian Gulf. Sosis Bandari means sausage from the port or port-style sausage. This part of Iran's cuisine is usually spicy.

Ingredients 
The main ingredients include sliced sausage, sliced onions, tomato paste, and ground chilli. Optional ingredients may include turmeric, chopped green pepper, curry and lime juice. The sausages usually used for this dish taste like Polish kielbasa, smoked sausage and hotdog.

Serving and use 
Port sausage is a hot thick stew, usually used as a filling for submarine  or baguette sandwiches. When used as a meal, it is usually served with submarine or baguette bread, sliced kosher dills and sliced tomatoes. Medium- and lower-class fast food, street stands or sandwich shops in Iran usually have port sausage (sosis bandari) on their menu.

Popularity 
Port sausage is very popular among high school and college students in Iran, as it is usually very cheap and inexpensive. While famous for being cheap and prepared from low-quality ingredients, the taste and popularity keep people interested after school and college time. It is considered a nostalgic cuisine among Iranian immigrants and can be found in some Persian restaurants outside Iran as well.

See also

 List of sausage dishes

References

External links 
 Vegetarian port sausage recipe, (In Persian).
 A port sausage recipe, (In Persian).
 A port sausage and potato recipe, (In Persian).
 An iranian port sausage recipe, (In Persian).

Iranian cuisine
Sausage dishes